"My Obsession" is a song by Australian rock band Icehouse, which was released in 1987 as the third single from their sixth studio album Man of Colours. The song was written by Iva Davies and Robert Kretschmer, and produced by David Lord. "My Obsession" peaked at No. 12 on Australia's Kent Music Report chart and No. 88 on the US Billboard Hot 100.

Music video
The song's music video was produced by Paul Flattery and directed by John Jopson. It was filmed in Minneapolis on a sound stage which had the same name as the band. The video achieved breakout rotation on MTV.

Critical reception
On its release, Michael Wellham of The Canberra Times "Pop cliches tarted up with synthesisers. On the flip, 'Your Confession' is an instrumental. The title reveals as little imagination as the track." In a review of the single's release in the US, Billboard described "My Obsession" as "commercially tailored pop for the under-25 crowd". Cash Box praised the song as an "example of pop-rock record making at its best", adding that Davies "has a voice so crystalline, so precise that it grabs and holds you".

Track listing
7–inch single (Australia 1987, US 1988)
"My Obsession" – 3:59
"Your Confession" – 4:12

Cassette single (US release)
"My Obsession" – 3:59
"Your Confession" – 4:12

7–inch single (US promo)
"My Obsession" – 3:59
"My Obsession" – 3:59

Personnel
Icehouse
 Iva Davies – vocals
 Robert Kretschmer – guitar
 Simon Lloyd – keyboards, programming
 Stephen Morgan – bass
 Andy Qunta – keyboards, piano
 Paul Wheeler – drums

Production
 David Lord – producer of "My Obsession"
 David Hemming – engineer and mastering assistance on "My Obsession"
 Carrie Motzing, Greg Henderson – assistant engineers on "My Obsession"
 Michael Brauer – mixing on "My Obsession"
 Don Bartley – mastering on "My Obsession"
 Andy Qunta – producer of "Your Confession"
 Simon Lloyd – producer and mixing on "Your Confession"

Charts

References

1987 songs
1987 singles
1988 singles
Icehouse (band) songs
Songs written by Iva Davies
Regular Records singles
Chrysalis Records singles